Simona Caparrini is an Italian actress, born in Florence. She is known for: To Rome with Love, directed by Woody Allen, where she plays Aunt Joan, the uptight member of Roman high society; Romeo and Juliet, directed by Carlo Carlei; and the Warner Bros. production The Man from U.N.C.L.E., directed by Guy Ritchie.

Early life
Caparrini, originally from Tuscany, graduated at the Theatre of Genova's Drama Academy, completing a three-year program. After her degree, she moved to New York City to study acting at the Union Square Theatre with the American actor George DiCenzo.

Career
Caparrini's film debut was il muro di gomma, directed by Italian director, Marco Risi. She was eventually chosen by Alberto Sordi, to play Wilma, opposite Sordi himself, in his film . She gained some fame with this role and promoted the movie in various cities along with Sordi.

Caparrini had a cameo role in The Postman (1994), playing Elsa Morante; then she played Ursula in the feature film Banditi (1995). She later starred in the feature film Il cielo è sempre più blu (1996) directed by Antonello Grimaldi.

Caparrini has acted in a number of Italian, French and Spanish TV series.

In 2000, Caparrini gained more visibility appearing in the film Io Amo Andrea (2000), where she plays Irene directed by Francesco Nuti; and in 2001, she was in Suor Sorriso, remake of the cult movie The Singing Nun, where she plays Clara, directed by Roger Deutsch; then eventually came the period piece Il Quaderno della spesa (2003), directed by Tonino Cervi; the comedy Nessun messaggio in segreteria (2005), directed by Luca Miniero and Paolo Genovese, opposite Carlo delle Piane and Pierfrancesco Favino; the French sci-fi 8th Wonderland (2008), directed by Nicholas Alberny and Jean Mach; Immaturi (2010), directed by Paolo Genovese, where she plays Katia, a stubborn sex addict permanently in group therapy; and Interno Giorno (2011), directed by Tommaso Rosseliini, where she plays Martina, the movie star's talent agent.

In 2012, Caparrini in Italy and abroad, was chosen by Woody Allen to play Aunt Joan in his feature film To Rome with Love.  In 2013, she had a cameo in the feature film Romeo and Juliet, as a noble woman friend of the Capulets. She co-starred in the 2015 spy film The Man from U.N.C.L.E., directed by Guy Ritchie.

Selected filmography

References

External links

 

1972 births
20th-century Italian actresses
21st-century Italian actresses
Italian film actresses
Italian television actresses
Living people
Actors from Florence